Azizollah Zarghami (1884–1978) was an Iranian army officer. He served as the chief of staff of the Imperial Army in Iran in the period 1934–1941 during the rule of Reza Shah.

Biography
Zarghami was born in Tehran in 1884. His father was Hussein Pashakhan Zargham Al Saltanah, one of the leaders of the Shaqaqi tribe. Zarghami trained at the Cossack school. After serving in the gendarmerie unit of the Iranian Army he was named the chief of staff in 1934 which he held until 1941 when Reza Shah abdicated. Later Zarghami served as the senator and governor of East Azerbaijan.

In 1961 Zarghami and three other generals were arrested as part of the anti-corruption campaign of Prime Minister Ali Amini and were released soon. Zarghami died in Tehran in 1978 and buried in Emamzadeh Abdollah, Tehran. One of his children, Ezatullah Zarghami, was also an army officer with the rank of brigadier general.

References

External links

20th-century Iranian politicians
1884 births
1978 deaths
Governors of East Azerbaijan Province
Imperial Iranian Army major generals
Iranian prisoners and detainees
Politicians from Tehran
People of Pahlavi Iran
Iranian people of Kurdish descent